3',4'-Dimethoxy-α-pyrrolidinopentiophenone (also known as O-2512, 3,4-dimethoxy-α-PVP, 3,4-DMPV, DMPVP) is a synthetic stimulant drug of the cathinone class that has been sold online as a designer drug. It is a relatively weak inhibitor of serotonin reuptake and has little affinity in vitro for dopamine or noradrenaline transporters.

See also 
 4Cl-PVP
 4F-PVP
 4-Et-PVP
 α-PBP
 α-PHP
 α-PPP
 α-PVP
 α-PVT
 MFPVP
 MOPVP
 MDPV
 O-2390
 Pyrovalerone

References 

Designer drugs
Norepinephrine–dopamine reuptake inhibitors
Pyrrolidinophenones
Stimulants
Propyl compounds